The 2010 TC 2000 Championship is the 32nd Turismo Competicion 2000 season.

Teams and drivers
 For the Buenos Aires 200 km, each entry implemented two drivers per car.

Race calendar and results
 A calendar of twelve dates without venues was released by the series on December 4, 2009. The race calendar was unveiled in early March.

Championship standings

References

External links
Official site 

TC 2000 Championship seasons
TC 2000 season
TC 2000 season